Alexandre Farnoux is a French historian, a specialist on the Minoan civilisation and Delos.

Career 
Alexandre Farnoux studied at the French School at Athens, he became director of this institute in September 2011.

He is professor of Greek archaeology at Paris-Sorbonne University and also teaches Greek history at the University of Strasbourg. He conducts research in Crete on the Minoan civilisation and is director of the excavation of a residential quarter in the Minoan city of Mallia.

An overview of the archaeological discoveries made in Knossos, Crete, from the beginning of the 20th century, especially by the British archaeologist Arthur Evans, a wealthy Englishman, who found the legendary palace of King Minos. From a plethora of bric-à-brac—frescoes, ceramics, clay tablets covered with unknown writings—Evans recreated an immense civilisation, totally original. A peaceful world which flourished some forty centuries ago, long before Mycenae, radiated throughout the Mediterranean.

Alexandre Farnoux retraces step by step the rigorous and inspired work of Arthur Evans—the excavations, interpretations, restorations, which will remain, with regard to History, the magician of Knossos—in this pocket-sized volume entitled  (lit. 'Knossos: The Archaeology of a Dream'; UK edition – Knossos: Unearthing a Legend; US edition – Knossos: Searching for the Legendary Palace of King Minos), published by Éditions Gallimard. It was released in 1993 in the  series of Gallimard's "Découvertes" collection. According to standards of the collection, the book is profusely illustrated with colour plates—Minoan frescoes, maps, drawings, paintings, photographs of artefacts and excavations, etc.—and printed on glossy paper.

The book opens with a "pre-credit", which is a series of full-page illustrations showing some drawings and photographs of the palace of Knossos. The first chapter "" presents Crete, the Greek island as an unknown land at the end of 19th century when Knossos was approached by Evans. The second chapter "Impatience" tells the works of archaeologists. "In the Land of the Griffin" (chap. III) recounts the excavations at Knossos. "The Magician of Knossos" (chap. IV) traces the rebirth of the palace of Knossos thanks to the dream of the English archaeologist. The last chapter "Minoan Art Nouveau" is about the exoticism and the surprising familiarity of the Cretan discoveries, which together presented a sort of ideal image of a modern-day antiquity: 

In its second part—the "Documents" section—the book provides a compilation of excerpts divided into eight parts: 1, In the Labyrinth; 2, The return of the Minotaur; 3, The past informs the present; 4, Archaeology and imagination; 5, The Minoan world today; 6, The Minoans in the headlines; 7, Forgers in the realm of Minos; 8, Cretan writing. The book closes with a list of further reading, chronology, list of illustrations, an index and a full-page photograph of Arthur Evans at Knossos. It has been translated into American and British English, Italian and South Korean.

Selected publications 
As author
 Cnossos : L'archéologie d'un rêve, collection « Découvertes Gallimard » (nº 175), série Archéologie. Éditions Gallimard, 1993
 UK edition – Knossos: Unearthing a Legend, 'New Horizons' series. Thames & Hudson, 1996
 US edition – Knossos: Searching for the Legendary Palace of King Minos, "Abrams Discoveries" series. Harry N. Abrams, 1996
 Homère : Le prince des poètes, collection « Découvertes Gallimard » (nº 555), série Littératures. Éditions Gallimard, 2010
As contributor
 , Delvaux and Antiquity, Exhibitions International, 2010
As editor
 With Nicoletta Momigliano, Cretomania: Modern Desires for the Minoan Past, Routledge, 2016
 With Katherine Harloe and Nicoletta Momigliano, Hellenomania, Routledge, 2018

References 

French archaeologists
Minoan archaeologists
French art historians
20th-century French non-fiction writers
Living people
Year of birth missing (living people)